The State Post Bureau is the government agency that regulates China Post, the postal service of the People's Republic of China.  The agency used to report to the Ministry of Industry and Information Technology and is now under the administration of the Ministry of Transport. The bureau is headed by the Director-General. The current Director-General is Ma Junsheng.

Its responsibilities includes protecting state interests and consumer rights, the development of the national postal network and universal postal delivery services.

The SPB used to have post bureaus in all the administrative divisions of the country which serve as public utility enterprises. But since 2007, these post services has been divided to China Post, a state-owned enterprise.

Administration

Management 
The agency is directed by a Director General and four Deputy Directors General.

Departmental structure 
The agency is organized into the following departments.
 Department of General Affairs (Department of External Affairs)
 Department of Policies and Legal Affairs
 Department of Universal Services 
 Department of Market Supervision & Inspection
 Department of Personnel
 Discipline Inspection Office (Party) and Supervision Bureau (executive)
 Administrative Service Center

References

External links 
 State Post Bureau Official Website

See also 

 China Post (Mainland Area, People's Republic of China)
 Chunghwa Post (Taiwan Area, Republic of China)

Postal service in Hong Kong and Macau are not handled by the State Bureau nor China Post but by separate entities:
 Hongkong Post (Hong Kong SAR, People's Republic of China)
 Macau Post (Macau SAR, People's Republic of China)

1949 establishments in China
Government agencies established in 1949
Government agencies of China
Ministry of Transport of the People's Republic of China
Postal system of China